The Road to Mecca, also known as Road to Mecca or Road to Makkah, is the autobiography of Muslim scholar, intellectual, political theorist and spiritual writer Muhammad Asad.

Reception
The book received critical acclaim upon publication, including reviews in prestigious New York City periodicals. One reviewer, writing in New York Herald Tribune Book Review, called it an “intensely interesting and moving book.”

New York World-Telegram wrote:

As suffused with Arab lore as Sir Richard Burton and almost as adventuresome as T.E. Lawrence, Muhammad Asad offers a similar blend of daring action and thoughtful observation. In addition, he surpasses either of these great predecessors as a prose stylist and interpreter of the Islamic faith

See also
 Timeline of Muhammad Asad's life
 The Message of The Qur'an
 This Law of Ours and Other Essays
 The Principles of State and Government in Islam

References

External links
 Google Books
 Martin Kramer's book review

1954 non-fiction books
Autobiographies
Islam-related literature
Muhammad Asad
1950s in Islam